Thunder Road is a black-and-white 1958 drama–crime film directed by Arthur Ripley and starring Robert Mitchum, who also produced the film and wrote the story. With Don Raye, Mitchum co-wrote the theme song, "The Ballad of Thunder Road". The supporting cast features Gene Barry, Jacques Aubuchon, Keely Smith, James Mitchum, Sandra Knight, and Peter Breck. The film's plot concerns running bootleg moonshine in the mountains of Kentucky, North Carolina, and Tennessee in the late 1950s. Thunder Road became a cult film and continued to play at drive-in movie theaters in some southeastern states through the 1970s and 1980s.

Plot
Korean War veteran Lucas Doolin (Robert Mitchum) works in the family moonshine business, delivering the illegal liquor his father distills to clandestine distribution points throughout the South in his souped-up hot rod. However, Lucas has more problems than evading the U.S. Treasury agents ("revenuers"), led by determined newcomer Troy Barrett (Gene Barry).

Lucas is concerned that his younger brother Robin (James Mitchum), who is also his mechanic, will be tempted into following in his footsteps and also become a moonshine runner. A well-funded outside gangster, Carl Kogan (Jacques Aubuchon), tries to gain control of the independent local moonshine producers and their distribution points, and is willing to kill anyone who stands in his way. The stakes rise when an attempt by Kogan to kill Lucas results in the death of a government agent and another moonshine driver (Mitchell Ryan).

In a romantic subplot, Lucas becomes involved with nightclub singer Francie Wymore (Keely Smith). He is unaware one of the neighbor girls, Roxanna Ledbetter (Sandra Knight), has a crush on him and fears for his life.

When a series of government raids destroys their hidden stills, Lucas's father and the other local moonshiners shut down production "for a spell" to let the government deal with Kogan in its own time, but Lucas is forced by circumstances and his own code of honor to make a fatal final run.

Factual background
The film was based loosely on an incident in which a driver transporting moonshine was said to have crashed to his death on Kingston Pike in Knoxville, Tennessee, between Bearden Hill and Morrell Road. Per Metro Pulse writer Jack Renfro, the incident occurred in 1952 and may have been witnessed by James Agee, who passed the story on to Mitchum.

Cast
 Robert Mitchum as Lucas Doolin
 Gene Barry as Troy Barrett
 Jacques Aubuchon as Carl Kogan
 Keely Smith as Francie Wymore
 Trevor Bardette as Vernon Doolin
 Sandra Knight as Roxanna Ledbetter
 James Mitchum as Robin Doolin
 Peter Breck as Stacey Gouge, a rival driver
 Mitchell Ryan as Jed Moultrie, a decoy driver 
 Nicholas Mann Konrad as Robert Mitchum's stunt driver

Cast notes
James Mitchum's role as Robin Doolin, Lucas's younger brother, was originally written for Elvis Presley per Robert Mitchum's request. Mitchum personally submitted the script to Elvis in Los Angeles. The singer was eager to play the role, but his manager, Colonel Tom Parker, demanded Elvis be paid a ridiculous sum of money, more than the entire budget for the movie, which ended negotiations. Mitchum's elder son James got the part, which worked well owing to his extremely close physical resemblance to his father.

Production
In the film, Mitchum drove a souped-up black 1950 Ford two-door sedan,(which was later repainted gray) with a custom tank in the back for moonshine liquor and a Ford V8 with three two-barrel carburetors, but after it was blown up by Kogan's men, it was replaced with a 1957 Ford Fairlane 500 two-door sedan with the same alterations excluding the carburetors. The 1951 Ford ended up getting blown up by Kogan, whose henchmen had planted a bomb that activated when a federal agent put the key in the ignition to start the car.  In the film, a closeup of the key being inserted in the ignition used a 1951 Ford for that and earlier interior shots.

Most of the scenes were filmed in Woodfin, North Carolina, along U.S. Route 19 and others at Lake Lure. Some scenes were filmed in Beech, east of Weaverville. Scenes include Reems Creek Road, Sugar Creek Road, and the Beech Community Center. Some scenes were actual local moonshine drivers shot with a camera mounted on a pickup tailgate. Many city scenes were filmed in Asheville, North Carolina, including the explosion of Doolin's car.

The stunt coordinator was Carey Loftin, with a stunt team of Hollywood's most accomplished stunt drivers, Ray Austin , Neil Castes Sr., Robert Hoy, and Dale Van Sickel.

The film's theme song, "The Whippoorwill", was sung by Keely Smith in her role as a nightclub singer, and a different studio rendition by her was released as a 45 rpm single on Capitol Records. The film's opening song is "The Ballad of Thunder Road", sung by Randy Sparks, a different arrangement of which was recorded by Mitchum and released as a popular 45 rpm single, also on Capitol.  Both songs were co-written by Mitchum.

In popular culture
Bruce Springsteen said at a 1978 concert that the name of his song "Thunder Road" had been inspired by seeing a poster of the movie, but he had not seen the movie.

In the episode of Cheers titled And Coachie Makes Three, Sam and Coach watch the movie as part of a long-running tradition they have with viewing Robert Mitchum movies.

See also
 List of American films of 1958

References

External links
 
 
 
 
 Lyrics & recording: "Ballad of Thunder Road"
  "Thunder Road festival held yearly (April) in Rockwood, TN."

1958 crime drama films
1958 films
American black-and-white films
American chase films
American crime drama films
Films about alcoholic drinks
Films about automobiles
Films directed by Arthur Ripley
Films scored by Jack Marshall
Films set in Appalachia
Films shot in North Carolina
United Artists films
1950s chase films
Moonshine in popular culture
1950s English-language films
1950s American films